Heddle is a surname of Scottish origin.

People with the surname include:

John Heddle (1941–1989), British Conservative Party politician
Charles Heddle (1812–1889), Scottish-Sierra Leonian businessman and shipowner
Kathleen Heddle (1965–2021), Canadian rower
Enid Moodie Heddle (1904–1991), Australian poet and writer for children
Matthew Forster Heddle (1828–1897), Scottish physician and amateur mineralogist
Ian Heddle (born 1963), Scottish footballer

Given name
Heddle Nash (1894–1961), an English lyric tenor

Scottish surnames